Aziz Pasha Abaza (born 13 August 1898 – 11 July 1973) was an Egyptian poet. He is known as one of the prominent poets in modern Egyptian and Arab literature.

Abaza's poems are preoccupied with Arab unity and Pan-Arabism. His poetry was an inspiration for Arabism advocates.

Early life 
Abaza was born in Minya El Qamh, Al Sharqiya governorate in Egypt. He joined the School of Law from where he graduated in 1923.

He worked as a member of Parliament, director of Identification Department, Egyptian Ministry of Interior in 1923 and Deputy-Governor of Beheira Governorate in 1935.

Moreover, he worked as governor of Al Qalyoubiya and Faiyum and Suez Canal Zone.

References

External links
Egyptian Figures, Aziz Abaza
Egypt State Information Service

1898 births
1973 deaths
20th-century Egyptian poets
Egyptian Arab nationalists
Egyptian civil servants
Egyptian male poets
Members of the House of Representatives (Egypt)
People from Sharqia Governorate
20th-century male writers
Governors of Minya
Governors of Asyut